Hyderabad House is a restaurant chain offering Hyderabadi cuisine. The chain is based in Hyderabad and has over 23 outlets in various locations across South India.

History
The restaurant was established in 1975 by Mir Babar Ali. However the founder of the current chain of restaurants is Mir Mazharuddin who started Hyderabad House as a small take-away restaurant in 1998. His son Mir Zubair Ahmed, and Hotel Management Gold medalist, present director launched Bowl O China (Chinese Restaurant). Ranjan Dodda CEO taking the brand to global level, they opened outlets in Mecca, Madina, Bahrain, Abu Dhabi, Sydney.

References

External links
 

Restaurants in India
Restaurants in Hyderabad, India
1975 establishments in Andhra Pradesh
Restaurants established in 1975